The SR postcode area, also known as the Sunderland postcode area, is a group of eight postcode districts in north-east England, within three post towns. These cover eastern Tyne and Wear (including Sunderland) and north-east County Durham (including Seaham and Peterlee).



Coverage
The approximate coverage of the postcode districts:

|-
! SR1
| SUNDERLAND
| Sunderland City Centre, East End, Hendon (north of Egerton Street)
| Sunderland
|-
! SR2
| SUNDERLAND
| Ashbrooke, Ryhope, Grangetown, Hendon (south of Salisbury Street), Hillview, Thornhill
| Sunderland
|-
! SR3
| SUNDERLAND
| Chapelgarth, Doxford Park, Farringdon, Elstob Farm, Essen Way, Gilley Law, Hall Farm, Herrington, Humbledon Hill, Mill Hill, Moorside, Plains Farm, Ryhope, Silksworth, Springwell Village, Thorney Close, Tunstall
| Sunderland
|-
! SR4
| SUNDERLAND
| Ayres Quay, Barnes, Chester Road, Deptford, Ford Estate, Grindon, Hastings Hill, Hylton Lane Estate, High Barnes, Millfield, Tyne and Wear, Pallion, Ford Estate, Pennywell, South Hylton
| Sunderland
|-
! SR5
| SUNDERLAND
| Carley Hill, Castletown, Downhill, Fulwell (west of Metro  line), Hylton Castle, Hylton Red House, Marley Pots, Monkwearmouth (west of Metro line), Sheepfolds, Southwick, Town End Farm, Witherwack
| Sunderland
|-
! SR6
| SUNDERLAND
| Cleadon, Fulwell (east of Metro line), Monkwearmouth (east of Metro line), North Haven, Roker, St Peter's Riverside, Seaburn, Seaburn Dene, South Bents, Whitburn
| Sunderland, South Tyneside
|-
! SR7
| SEAHAM
| Cold Hesledon, Dalton-le-Dale, Dawdon, Deneside, Greenhill, Murton, Northlea, Parkside, Seaham, Westlea
| County Durham
|-
! SR8
| PETERLEE
| Easington, Easington Colliery, Horden, Little Thorpe, Peterlee
| County Durham
|-
! style="background:#FFFFFF;"|SR9
| style="background:#FFFFFF;"|SUNDERLAND
| style="background:#FFFFFF;"|PO Boxes
| style="background:#FFFFFF;"|non-geographic
|-
! style="background:#FFFFFF;"|SR43
| style="background:#FFFFFF;"|SUNDERLAND
| style="background:#FFFFFF;"|non-geographic
| style="background:#FFFFFF;"|non-geographic
|}

Map

References

External links
Royal Mail's Postcode Address File
A quick introduction to Royal Mail's Postcode Address File (PAF)

See also
Postcode Address File
List of postcode areas in the United Kingdom

City of Sunderland
Postcode areas covering North East England